Thomas William Jutten (June 15, 1861 – April 10, 1955) was a Canadian politician.

Born in London, England, Jutten moved to Canada with his family in 1871, settling in Hamilton, Ontario.  In 1881, he married Suzanne Keil. He owned a boatbuilding business. Juttern served as an alderman from 1906 to 1913 and on the Board of Control from 1914 to 1920.  In 1921, he unsuccessfully ran for mayor of the city, losing to George Charles Coppley.  He tried again in 1923 and was elected.  He served in this post until 1925.

In 1926, he became the Conservative Member of Provincial Parliament for Hamilton Centre and served until he was defeated in 1934.

External links
Member's parliamentary history for the Legislative Assembly of Ontario
Mayors of Hamilton, Hamilton Public Library

1861 births
1955 deaths
Progressive Conservative Party of Ontario MPPs
Mayors of Hamilton, Ontario